Francisco Daniel Simões Rodrigues (born 27 February 1997 in Aveiro) known as Kiko, is a Portuguese footballer who plays for G.D. Estoril Praia, as a midfielder.

Football career
On 12 August 2016, Kiko made his professional debut with Vitória Guimarães B in a 2016–17 LigaPro match against Aves.

References

External links

Stats and profile at LPFP 

Kiko Rodrigues at playmakerstats.com (English version of zerozero.pt)

1997 births
Living people
Portuguese footballers
Association football midfielders
Liga Portugal 2 players
Primeira Liga players
Vitória S.C. players
Vitória S.C. B players
G.D. Estoril Praia players
Portugal youth international footballers
People from Aveiro, Portugal
Sportspeople from Aveiro District